Blood, Sweat & Tears are an American jazz-rock group.

Blood, Sweat & Tears may also refer to:

Film and television
 Blood, Sweat and Tears (1986 film), a British television film by John Godber in the anthology series ScreenPlay
 "Blood, Sweat & Tears" (CSI: NY episode)

Music
 Blood, Sweat and Tears (album), a 1963 album by Johnny Cash
 Blood, Sweat & Tears (Blood, Sweat & Tears album) (1968)
 Blood, Sweat & Tears (Ace Hood album)
 "The Blood, the Sweat, the Tears", a 1999 song by Machine Head from The Burning Red
 "Blood, Sweat and Tears", a 2004 song by V
 "Blood, Sweat and Tears", a 2014 song by Upon a Burning Body from The World Is My Enemy Now
 "Blood Sweat & Tears" (song), a 2016 song by BTS
 "Blood, Sweat & Tears", a 2019 song by Ava Max

See also
Blood, toil, tears, and sweat, a phrase used in a 1940 speech by Winston Churchill
"Blood & Tears", a song by Sentenced from The Cold White Light, 2002